Hugh McDonald Plowman (21 April 1889 – 19 July 1916) was an Australian rules footballer who played with St Kilda in the Victorian Football League. Also an adept cricketer, he enlisted in the army during World War I. He met the Prince of Wales after receiving his commission as an officer, but was killed in action during the Attack at Fromelles in 1916.

See also
 List of Victorian Football League players who died in active service

References

External links
 
 Roll of Honour at the Australian War Memorial
 Grant, A., "Lest We Forget! Anzac Day 2010", saints.com, 21 April 2010.

1889 births
1916 deaths
St Kilda Football Club players
Brighton Football Club players
Australian military personnel killed in World War I
Australian rules footballers from Melbourne
People from South Melbourne
Military personnel from Melbourne